Colnago CM Team is a Colombian professional Women's cycling team, which competes in the UCI Women's World Tour and other elite races. The team was founded in 2020.

Major results
2021
Stage 4 Vuelta Femenina a Guatemala, Erika Botero

Continental & national Champions
2021
 Ukraine Time Trial, Valeria Kononenko
 Pan American Track (Team Pursuit), Tatiana Dueñas

References

Cycling teams based in Colombia
Cycling teams established in 2020